Sibley-Ocheyedan Community School District (SOCSD) is a rural public school district headquartered in Sibley, Iowa. The district, entirely in Osceola County, serves Sibley and Ocheyedan.

The district formed on July 1, 1985, as a merger of the Sibley and Ocheyedan school districts.

Schools
All schools are in Sibley.
 Sibley-Ocheyedan High School (grades 7–12) -  it had about 40 employees and 350 students.
 Sibley-Ocheyedan Middle School (grades 5–8)
 Sibley-Ocheyedan Elementary School (K-4)

It previously operated two separate elementary schools: Ben Franklin Elementary School and Ocheyedan Elementary School. The district closed the latter school in 2009. A reduction in the number of students was the reason for the closure. By 2014, the district was trying to find another use for the building.

Sibley-Ocheyedan High School

Athletics
The Generals are members of the Siouxland Conference, and participate in the following sports:
Football
 1978 Class 2A State Champions
Cross Country
 Girls' 1997 Class 2A State Champions
Volleyball
Basketball
 Girls' 2-time State Champions (1986, 1996) 
Wrestling
Golf
 Boys' 3-time State Champions (1977, 1978, 2013)
 Girls' 2-time Class 1A State Champions (1984, 1985)
Track and Field
Baseball
Softball

See also
List of school districts in Iowa
List of high schools in Iowa

References

External links
 Sibley-Ocheyedan Community School District
 

School districts in Iowa
Education in Osceola County, Iowa
1985 establishments in Iowa
School districts established in 1985